Schwinge may refer to:

Schwinge (Elbe), a river of Lower Saxony, Germany, tributary of the Elbe
Schwinge (Peene),  a river of Mecklenburg-Vorpommern, Germany, tributary of the Peene